William "Biff" McGuire (October 25, 1926 – March 9, 2021) was an American actor, best known as Inspector Kramer in Nero Wolfe (1979).

Early years
McGuire attended Hamden High School and the University of Massachusetts, where he studied agricultural engineering. He left the university to join the U.S. Army. While stationed in England, he studied at Shrivenham University; while there he painted sets for and acted in a local theater's production. That experience led to a role in a play in London.

Career
In a career that has spanned 50 years, McGuire collected a number of theatrical credits. He debuted on Broadway in Bright Boy (1944). 

On October 9, 1955, McGuire starred in the episode "Number Seven, Hangman's Row" of the CBS anthology series, Appointment with Adventure. He also starred in the Alfred Hitchcock Presents episodes "The Gentleman From America" (1956), "The Hidden Thing" (1956), "Crackpot" (1957), and "Don't Interrupt" (1958, as Larry Templeton). He appeared in such television series as The Secret Storm and All My Children.

McGuire was a regular on Herb Shriner Time (1951–1952) on ABC and portrayed Dr. Michael Malloy in the NBC drama Gibbsville (1976).

Personal life
McGuire was married to the English actress Jeannie Carson, who had starred in the CBS situation comedy Hey, Jeannie! (1956–1957). Carson co-starred with McGuire in Finian's Rainbow. 

He died on March 9, 2021, at the age of 94.

Recognition
He was nominated for two Tony Awards during his career: 
1997 Actor (Featured Role—Play) for The Young Man From Atlanta
2002 Actor (Featured Role—Play) for Morning's at Seven

Filmography

You're in the Navy Now (1951) as Sailor Messenger (uncredited)
The Phenix City Story (1955) as Fred Gage
 Alfred Hitchcock Presents (1956) as Howard Latimer in Gentleman from America 
Station Six-Sahara (1963) as Jimmy
The Thomas Crown Affair (1968) as Sandy
The Heart is a Lonely Hunter (1968) as Mr. Kelly
Paradise Lost (1971) as Phil Foley
The Werewolf of Washington (1973) as President
Serpico (1973) as Captain McClain 
Gunsmoke (1974)  as Potter season 20 episode 8 (the fourth victim)
John O'Hara's Gibbsville (a.k.a. The Turning Point of Jim Malloy) (TV movie, 1975) as Dr. Michael Malloy
Midway (1976) as Captain Miles Browning
Gibbsville (TV series, 6 episodes, 1976) as Dr. Michael Malloy
Hawaii Five-O (episode: "See How She Runs") as Babe Mandell
Child of Glass (1978) as Joe Armsworth
The Paper Chase (1979) as Smathers
The Last Word (1979) as Governor Davis
Nero Wolfe (1979) as Inspector Cramer
Hollywood Seagull (2013) as Bruce Sorensen

Theatre
 Finian's Rainbow (1960 revival) – Broadway (Woody)
 Camelot (1963) – national tour (King Arthur)
 The Day Emily Married (2005) – Off-Broadway
 Young Man From Atlanta (1997) – Broadway
 Morning's at Seven (2002) – Broadway

References

External links
 
 
 
  
 
 

1926 births
2021 deaths
American expatriates in the United Kingdom
American male film actors
Place of death missing
American male musical theatre actors
United States Army personnel of World War II